Red Rooster is an Australian fast food chain.

Red Rooster may also refer to:

People
 Terry Taylor, professional wrestler known as the Red Rooster

Food
 Red Rooster (drink), an energy drink in the U.S. and the U.K.
 Red Rooster hot sauce
 Red Rooster, a Marcus Samuelsson restaurant in Harlem

Music
 Red Rooster Records, a record label
 "Little Red Rooster", a blues standard written by Willie Dixon

Bands
 Red Rooster (band), a band formed in 1998
 The Red Roosters (band), a Los Angeles, California-based band from 1965 that featured some members of what would later be Spirit
 The Red Roosters, a blues/rock band from Osijek, Croatia formed in the summer of 2003
 The Red Roosters, a rock & roll band from Milan, Italy formed in 2010
 Red Roosters, a rock & roll and rockabilly band from Győr, Hungary formed in 2017.

Sports
 Charleroi Red Roosters, an ice hockey team in Charleroi, Belgium
 Red Rooster Racing, a motorsports company of India

Other uses
 Red Rooster Group, a New York-based marketing agency
 Red Rooster Nite Club, a 1931 era Las Vegas Nightclub located where The Mirage now stands
 Vegas Red Rooster a Las Vegas Swingers club established in 1982
 Pelagia and the Red Rooster, a Russian mystery novel

See also

 Rooster (disambiguation)
 Red (disambiguation)
 Rhode Island Red, a breed of roosters